Giancarlo Fisichella (born 14 January 1973), also known as Fisico, Giano or Fisi, is an Italian professional racing driver, also captain of the official Nazionale Piloti association football team (composed of the racing drivers). He has driven in Formula One for Minardi, Jordan, Benetton, Sauber, Renault, Force India and Ferrari. Since then he has driven for AF Corse in their Ferrari 458 GTE at various sportscar events, becoming twice a Le Mans 24 Hour class winner, and a GT class winner of the Petit Le Mans at Road Atlanta. He was also Ferrari's F1 reserve driver for 2010.

Fisichella won three races in his Formula One career, the first of which was at the chaotic 2003 Brazilian Grand Prix, a race abandoned for safety reasons with 15 laps remaining. After several days of confusion regarding rules and technicalities, Fisichella was eventually declared the winner in the following week, and collected his trophy in an unofficial ceremony at the following race. He was brought into the Renault team to replace fellow Italian Jarno Trulli, and won his first race with the team in Australia in 2005. However, after that race it was his teammate, the Spanish driver Fernando Alonso, that would win the greater share of races for Renault. Although highly rated as a driver, Fisichella was unable to keep pace with eventual champion Alonso, managing just one further race win following his debut. However, his best finishes also helped Renault win back to back Constructors' titles from 2005 to 2006. Outside of driving, he has backed his own GP2 team, FMS International.

On 17 June 2012 Fisichella won the GTE Pro division of the Le Mans 24hrs for AF Corse and followed this up with the Manufacturers' title in the WEC at the end of the season.

Early career
Like most current Formula One drivers, he began kart racing as a youngster in the Guidonia's Kart circuit. In 1992, he competed in the Italian Formula Three Championship, racing for the RC Motorsport team. He finished runner up in 1993, and in 1994 he won the championship, following race victories in Monaco and Macau. He left open-wheel racing briefly in 1995 and 1996, driving for Alfa Romeo in the International Touring Car Championship.

Formula One

Minardi (1996)
In , he made the move to Formula One, making his debut for the Minardi team, after being the official test driver the previous season. However he did not complete the full season since Minardi required a driver who could bring funding to the team, and replaced Fisichella with Giovanni Lavaggi.

Jordan (1997)
For 1997 he made the move to Eddie Jordan's eponymous team, where he drove alongside former F1 champion Michael Schumacher's brother Ralf, himself a former Formula Nippon champion. Fisichella gained his first podium finish at the 1997 Canadian Grand Prix, and went on to finish higher in the points standings than his teammate. At Hockenheim a victory looked to be within reach for Fisichella, but a puncture and the performance of an on-form Gerhard Berger denied him the win. Fisichella was able to show his talent again at the rain-soaked Belgian Grand Prix in which he finished a commendable second behind Michael Schumacher. Following this race, the Benetton team signed him for 1998.

Benetton (1998–2001)

Following Renault's withdrawal from Formula One, Benetton would contest the 1998 season without factory-supplied engines, instead using rebranded development versions of 1997 Renault engines. Despite not having the latest engines, Fisichella still managed second places at Montreal and Monaco, and was in contention for a victory in Canada until gearbox problems slowed him down. In Austria, Fisichella scored his first pole position, although an on-track clash with Jean Alesi during the race cost him any chance of a good result. He was then able to add only two more points to his total in the second half of the year as Benetton lost ground on their competition.

1999 proved to be a similarly inconsistent season. He did score some points finishes, including second at Montreal, and again came close to a victory in the European Grand Prix, until he spun off whilst in the lead. This would prove to be his best chance of a victory for the next few seasons.

Fisichella's season was to follow a similar pattern in 2000. He again gained some surprise podium finishes early in the year, but Benetton's poor second half of the season meant that he failed to score any more points. After his first Benetton year, when he finished one point behind him, Fisichella had comprehensively outperformed his Austrian teammate Alexander Wurz, who would then leave the team to make way for British driver Jenson Button in 2001. Renault had purchased the Benetton team after the start of the 2000 season, but their radical engine design meant Benetton had an uncompetitive 2001 car, and as a result, Fisichella was battling for much of the season with teams such as Minardi and Prost. However, the efforts of technical director Mike Gascoyne and his staff did result in improvements over the year, culminating in a 4–5 finish at the German Grand Prix and a third-place finish for Fisichella at the Belgian race. Although Fisichella had gained the team's best results that season and consistently outperformed Button, he was not retained by the team, so he rejoined Jordan for 2002.

Return to Jordan (2002–2003)

Fisichella scored seven points in 2002, while comfortably outpacing new teammate Takuma Sato, although the Jordan-Honda car of that year was never truly competitive. After Honda withdrew their engine supply, Jordan switched to Ford engines for the 2003 season, but the team were still unable to compete with the top teams on the grid. Despite this lack of performance, Fisichella won his first race at the Brazilian Grand Prix. Battling with McLaren's Kimi Räikkönen amidst heavy rain and numerous crashes, Fisichella took the race lead on lap 54, just before the race was red-flagged. However, he was demoted to second place on the podium, because under the regulations, the race results were declared at two laps before the red flag, at which point Räikkönen was thought to have been the race leader. Several days later, though, the FIA determined that Fisichella had already begun his 56th lap before the red flag, meaning that he, and not Räikkönen, had been leading the race two laps before its premature end, awarding the Italian his first F1 victory. Fisichella was the only F1 driver to have won a race without having stood atop the podium. He collected the winner's trophy at the next race at Imola. Fisichella's only other points finish of 2003 was to be a seventh place at Indianapolis.

Sauber (2004)

Unhappy with the Jordan team's performance, Fisichella moved to Sauber in 2004 in the hope of greater results, and of using the team as a way of gaining access to, and a drive for, 2003 World Champions Ferrari, who supplied re-badged engines to the Sauber team. Fisichella drove well all year, comfortably outpacing teammate Felipe Massa for much of the season (scoring 22 championship points vs Massa's 12).

Renault (2005–2007)

2005

His strong performances prompted his former Benetton-Renault team boss Flavio Briatore to re-sign him for the 2005 season as partner to the young Spanish driver Fernando Alonso. A win at the season opening race at Melbourne signalled the Formula One breakthrough that commentators had been predicting, but it proved to be something of a false dawn. A run of poor luck saw Fisichella fall behind his teammate in the championship standings, and at times the pair were achieving noticeably different lap times with the same equipment. It appeared that Fisichella simply did not have the pace to match Alonso.

The difference in pace between Fisichella and Alonso was noticeable, and while Alonso's metronomic consistency helped him win the 2005 championship, Fisichella's general bad luck was to cost him points finishes. He was overtaken and lost the lead on the final lap of the Japanese Grand Prix by McLaren driver Kimi Räikkönen, despite his race engineer urging him to avoid letting Räikkönen past, which earned him heavy criticism from the press. Nevertheless, his performances alongside Alonso throughout the season enabled Renault to win the World Constructors' Championship ahead of McLaren and Ferrari, the latter of which had won that title the previous six seasons.

2006

2006 proved to be a similar season for Fisichella. Having won in Malaysia, putting in a strong performance to win from the pole position, he failed to maintain that pace for the upcoming races, and even failed to reach the top ten in qualifying for two races. This form, in addition to a penalty in Monaco for allegedly impeding David Coulthard, meant Fisichella was again unable to challenge his teammate Alonso for the Drivers' Championship. Some strong results in the second half of the 2006 season, including finishing ahead of Alonso at the US Grand Prix, enabled Fisichella to obtain his best ever results: Fourth in the World Drivers' Championship with 72 points, one win, and five podium finishes. After finishing third in the 2006 Japanese Grand Prix, Fisichella dedicated the result to his best friend, Tonino Visciani, who died of a heart attack on the Thursday before the race. Nevertheless, he was able to get 6th place in Brazil to secure the Constructors' title for Renault.

2007

In 2007 Giancarlo Fisichella became Renault's lead driver after the departure of Fernando Alonso. His teammate was the team's former test driver, the young Finn Heikki Kovalainen, who was replaced as test driver by Nelson Piquet Jr.

Renault did not demonstrate the same level of pace as in previous seasons, which had seen them win successive World Championships. It remains unclear whether the difference was due to the change of tyre supplier from Michelin to Bridgestone, the driving abilities of Fernando Alonso, or simply being outpaced in off-season development by the other top teams. Another possibility is that the team's wind tunnel was giving inaccurate data in late 2006 which affected the development of the 2007 car. This was cited by Pat Symonds in an issue of F1 Racing Magazine. In the early races, Fisichella obtained better results than rookie teammate Kovalainen, but in Canada and the USA it was the Finn who claimed the higher finishes. Fisichella was disqualified from the Canadian Grand Prix, along with Ferrari's Felipe Massa, for exiting the pit lane while the traffic light was showing red, the purpose of which is to prevent cars rejoining the race ahead of the safety car. He later stated that he had been busy avoiding other cars in the pit lane and had simply not noticed the red light. The Renault team seemed to have made significant progress in terms of pace by the Spanish Grand Prix, but a series of fuel rig problems meant that neither driver was able to capitalise on this apparent increase in performance. Fisichella crashed into the Super Aguri of Anthony Davidson at the 2007 Hungarian Grand Prix which broke his rear suspension and forced him to retire.

Force India (2008–2009)

2008

With Renault signing Fernando Alonso and Nelson Piquet Jr. Fisichella was announced as the number one driver alongside Adrian Sutil for the Force India F1 team for the  season (This was the third stint for Fisichella at the former Jordan team) on 10 January 2008. In the 2008 Monaco Grand Prix, he became the 9th driver to join the '200' club for drivers to have competed in at least 200 Grands Prix.

Fisichella finished the season pointless, as did the Force India team. However, there were a few moments when he found himself in a points position, such as the Brazilian Grand Prix, where an early change to soft compound tyres and his wet-weather ability saw him climb as high as 3rd. On 17 October, Force India announced they would keep Fisichella for the 2009 season.

2009
With the new Force India VJM02 powered by a Mercedes-Benz engine, Fisichella qualified 18th (promoted to 15th after both Toyotas and Lewis Hamilton were demoted) on the grid for the 2009 curtain-opener at Australia. He finished 11th in the race itself. In Malaysia, he qualified 18th, and was classified in the same position, having spun off in the torrential rain that stopped the race on lap 33.

On 29 August 2009, making the most of some very effective technical upgrades from Force India, Fisichella recorded the team's first pole position at the Belgian Grand Prix. He went on to score Force India's first points in Formula One with a strong second-place finish behind Ferrari's Kimi Räikkönen.

During that weekend, there were rumours that Fisichella might replace fellow Italian Luca Badoer (who was himself replacing the injured Felipe Massa) and become a Ferrari driver, something that he admitted he always wanted to do. On 3 September 2009, an official press statement confirmed Fisichella would be released from Force India to drive for Ferrari at the Italian Grand Prix, his home race.

Ferrari (2009)
Fisichella signed a contract as Ferrari's driver for the remainder of the 2009 season and reserve driver for 2010 on 3 September 2009. However, he had not ruled out continuing to race for another team in 2010, saying "if there is a good option to find another seat in another team it would be good". Beginning with the 2009 Italian Grand Prix, he replaced the injured Felipe Massa for the remainder of the 2009 season.

Fisichella remained Ferrari's reserve driver for  but had been keen to keep racing for a different team. He admitted that Sauber was a strong option and was strongly linked to the team, however his hopes of driving for Sauber in 2010 were ended when Pedro de la Rosa was confirmed as the team's second driver. He was also linked to a possible return to Force India but the team confirmed former teammate Adrian Sutil and fellow Italian Vitantonio Liuzzi. As a result, he remained one of Ferrari's test drivers for  along with fellow Italian Luca Badoer, Spaniard Marc Gené, Frenchman Jules Bianchi and Italian MotoGP rider Valentino Rossi.

At the end of 2010, Fisichella along with Luca Badoer and Marc Gené was replaced by Jules Bianchi as Ferrari test driver ahead of the 2011 season. However he remains a part of the Italian team and attended their annual 'Wroom' media event at Madonna di Campiglio in January 2011.

Helmet
Fisichella's helmet was white with two yellow and green lines with a blue diamond on the center of the lines running on each half of the helmet (forming a X in the sides) and around the visor; on the top there was a blue drop. In 2004, silver and chrome flames were incorporated in the design by Fisichella's then painter, Carsten Meurer of MRC Design. In 2007, Barney Stinton, part of Fisichella's management team incorporated the Italian colours into the design and the helmet was realised by Jens Munser of JMD, a design he uses to this day. Whilst at Renault it featured a light blue ring. Once at Ferrari, his helmet turned black and grey.

In 2004, whilst racing for Sauber, Fisichella became the first driver in Formula 1 to have his HANS device painted in his colours, Massa followed soon after and then the rest of the grid had theirs painted.

Sports cars
Fisichella made his sports car racing debut in 2010 by driving for AF Corse in a Ferrari F430 in the Le Mans Series as well as briefly in the American Le Mans Series as part of the Ferrari deal he signed in mid-2009.

In 2011, Fisichella, co-driver Gianmaria Bruni, and team AF Corse won both the driver's and team's championships in the LM GTE Pro class of the Le Mans Series, finished 2nd at the Le Mans 24hrs and won the 1000 miles of Petit Le Mans and helped AF Corse win the team's championship in the Intercontinental Le Mans Cup.

In 2012 Fisichella was again with AF Corse and took part in the 2012 World Endurance Championship He won the season opener and came 2nd in the 6hrs of Spa.

In the 80th edition of the 24 Hours of Le Mans in 2012, Fisichella and the AF Corse Team scored first place in the GTE-Pro class along with his co-drivers Toni Vilander and Gianmaria Bruni; their Ferrari 458 Italia covered a total of 335 laps (2,845.53 miles), of the Circuit de la Sarthe. Fisichella had the honor of driving the last stage of the competition.
After a difficult 2013 Fisichella moved to the TUSCC Series in America to race for Risi Competizione but returned to AF Corse and teammates Bruni and Vilander for the 2014 edition the Le Mans 24hrs. After a hard-fought race, they emerged victorious covering 339 laps, 4 more than their 2012 win tally. Fisichella then returned to America and won at Road America and Virginia International Raceway, he currently lies 8th in the GT Le Mans standings.

Open Wheel Racing 
Fisichella in 2022 will compete in 1 round and 3 races at the 2022 Valo Adelaide 500 in the S5000 category. "I am thrilled to be coming back to Australia to race S5000 – at last,” he stated. "My Formula 1 career started literally a few weeks after the last F1 race in Adelaide. I have never driven on the circuit, which is now a slightly shorter version of the GP track. [I] am looking forward to it enormously. I expect the S5000 car will be fast there. I’m also thrilled to be driving with Team BRM, which has a great record in racing in Australia." The Adeliade 500 Chiefe Executive, Mark warren also stated “We are ecstatic to host ‘Fisi’ in Adelaide and have no doubt he’ll put on a show for all eventgoers, particularly the Formula 1 enthusiasts. "Fisichella brings quality experience from his driving pursuits in Formula 1, GT and sports car racing around the world and adds to the high calibre motorsport programme. We’re now just under a month to go until we hit the track and this latest signing kicks off a string of big announcements we expect to roll out in the coming weeks.”

Racing record

Career summary

Complete Deutsche Tourenwagen Meisterschaft results

Complete International Touring Car Championship

† Driver did not finish the race, but was classified as he completed over 90% of the race distance.

Complete Formula One results
(key) (Races in bold indicate pole position) (Races in italics indicate fastest lap)

† Driver did not finish the race, but was classified as he completed over 90% of the race distance.

Complete 24 Hours of Le Mans results

24 Hours of Daytona results

12 Hours of Sebring results

10 Hours / 1000 miles of Petit Le Mans results

Complete International Superstars Series results
(key) (Races in bold indicate pole position) (Races in italics indicate fastest lap)

Complete FIA World Endurance Championship results
(key) (Races in bold indicate pole position; races in
italics indicate fastest lap)

Complete IMSA SportsCar Championship results
(key) (Races in bold indicate pole position; results in italics indicate fastest lap)

Complete S5000 results

Personal life 
Fisichella is related to the so named Italian noble family, forming part of the Sicilian nobility.

Fisichella married Luna Castellani on 10 October 2009. They have three children: Carlotta, Christopher and Carolina.

He is a supporter of Italian Serie A side Roma, and captain of the official Nazionale Piloti association football team.

Fisichella has a cameo appearance in the 2019 film The Art of Racing in the Rain, playing a Scuderia Ferrari crew member in the closing scenes.

See also 
Fisichella family
Fisichella (surname)

References

External links

 The official website for Giancarlo Fisichella
 Giancarlo Fisichella profile and statistics
 Giancarlo Fisichella statistics
 Giancarlo Fisichella profile

1973 births
Living people
People of Sicilian descent
Racing drivers from Rome
Italian racing drivers
Italian Formula One drivers
Minardi Formula One drivers
Jordan Formula One drivers
Benetton Formula One drivers
Sauber Formula One drivers
Renault Formula One drivers
Force India Formula One drivers
Ferrari Formula One drivers
Formula One race winners
Italian Formula Three Championship drivers
24 Hours of Le Mans drivers
European Le Mans Series drivers
Deutsche Tourenwagen Masters drivers
Karting World Championship drivers
Italian expatriates in Monaco
American Le Mans Series drivers
Rolex Sports Car Series drivers
24 Hours of Daytona drivers
Superstars Series drivers
FIA World Endurance Championship drivers
WeatherTech SportsCar Championship drivers
European Touring Car Championship drivers
Giancarlo
British Formula Three Championship drivers
Blancpain Endurance Series drivers
Asian Le Mans Series drivers
RC Motorsport drivers
AF Corse drivers
Tasman Series drivers
Ferrari Competizioni GT drivers
Iron Lynx drivers